Kabufuda are Japanese playing cards used for gambling games such as Oicho-Kabu.

Kabufuda cards, like the related hanafuda, are smaller and stiffer than Western playing cards.  A deck contains 40 cards, with designs representing the numbers 1 through 10.  There are four cards for each number.

Like hanafuda, kabufuda is a descendant of mekuri karuta. Since suits are irrelevant in kabu games, all decks became single-suited during the 18th-century. Like in baccarat, the object of most kabu games is to get a total closest to nine. Early kabufuda decks had three ranks of face cards but since they have no value, only the jacks were kept. Kabu is believed to derive from the Portuguese slang cavo meaning a stake, bet, or wager. Closely related are the gabo games played with Korean tujeon cards and the Indian Ganjapa game of komi.

References

External links
Kabufuda cards (image)
Kabufuda site (Japanese)

Japanese card games
Playing cards